HMS Jupiter (F60) was a Batch 3  of the Royal Navy (RN). She was, like the rest of the class, named after a figure of mythology. Built by Yarrow Shipbuilders of Scotstoun, she was launched on 4 September 1967 and commissioned on 9 August 1969.

Service history

1970s 

In 1970, HMS Jupiter deployed to the West Indies. In 1971, she joined Standing Naval Force Atlantic (STANAVFORLANT), a multi-national squadron of NATO. In 1972, Jupiter was again present in the West Indies as part of STANAVFORLANT taking over the duty of HMS Naiad which had suffered a mechanical breakdown. The following year, Jupiter took part in the Second Cod War. On 26 May 1973, she and her Wasp helicopter assisted the British trawler Everton, which was taking water after being hit by naval gunfire from the Icelandic gunboat Ægir. Jupiter then visited Africa on her way to the Far East and Pacific, and carried out a variety of duties, including performing fly-the-flag visits to numerous ports. Jupiter also visited Christchurch, New Zealand during the 1974 Commonwealth Games and the American naval base at Pearl Harbor where some propulsion problems were sorted out. Charles, Prince of Wales joined Jupiter as Ship's Communications Officer in January 1974 and remained until her return to the UK later that year.

In late 1976, Jupiter joined the 7th Frigate Squadron as Captain F7, Jupiter led the 7th Frigate Squadron in the annual Group Deployment (Group 5 - January to May 1977, led by FOF2 in the cruiser ), performing naval exercises and visiting the Caribbean Sea and Rio de Janeiro and Salvador, Brazil in April 1977 and Funchal, Madeira. She also took part in the Fleet Review at Spithead on 28 June 1977, in celebration of Queen Elizabeth II's Silver Jubilee. After the Fleet Review, frigates of the 7th Frigate Squadron visited different ports in south Wales, Jupiter visiting Cardiff in early July 1977. Later that year, Jupiter became the Gibraltar Guard ship and in 1979 represented the United Kingdom in the Siege of Savannah 200th Anniversary.

All members of the crew were given HMS Hero cap tallies for filming purposes. The main ship used for filming was, however, .

1980s 

In 1980, Jupiters modernisation commenced, and included the addition of the Sea Wolf missile system, as well as the removal of her twin  gun turret in favour of the Exocet anti-ship missile. The boilers were modified to the Babcock & Wilcox Y160 Steam Atomisation type water-tube boiler. the modernisation was completed in 1983.

On 13 June 1984, as she was leaving the Pool of London after a visit to the capital, she collided with London Bridge, causing significant damage to both ship and bridge. The ship's captain, Commander Colin Hamilton was later court martialled at Portsmouth on 4 December 1984. Hamilton was severely reprimanded.

In September 1986, Jupiter was part of the NATO exercise "Autumn Train '86'" and visited Gibraltar, then spent a continuous four weeks in the Mediterranean Sea, and returned to Gibraltar prior to returning to her (then) home base of Plymouth.  Jupiter changed her home port to Portsmouth in 1985. She was a member of the 7th Frigate Squadron.

Her exploits were broadcast by the BBC World Service.

During the Armilla Patrol, Jupiter paid courtesy calls to Gibraltar, Djibouti, Aqaba, Doha, Muscat, and Mombasa, and returned via the Suez Canal and Piraeus. After a transit of the Corinth Canal.

Between 1984 and 1986, Jupiter also visited Bremerhaven, Amsterdam, Bordeaux and Middlesbrough.
In September 1986, she was Guard ship to the Tall Ships Race visit to Newcastle upon Tyne.

Jupiter was twinned with the town of Middlesbrough in North East England.

1990s 

During the First Gulf War, Jupiter was on Armilla Patrol, which was created in 1980 in response to the increased danger posed by the Iran–Iraq War to British interests. Her last deployment came in late 1991 to early 1992 when she deployed to the South Atlantic as the Guard ship and returned via Rio de Janeiro and Barbados where she carried out anti drug patrols.  Jupiter decommissioned in 1992 after a final visit to her affiliated town of Middlesbrough. She was sold for scrap in 1997 and towed to Alang in India to be beached and broken up.

See also
 Warship (TV series)
 
 Royal Navy

References

Publications
 
 Marriott, Leo, 1983.  Royal Navy Frigates 1945-1983, Ian Allan Ltd.

External links
 HMS Jupiter Association website
 Warship Episode Guide
 British Film Institute site on Warship
 Royal Navy leaflet on Warship, from the HMS Phoebe Association website
 Comments on Warship by series Director Michael Briant
 Webpage (at Home > Scriptwriting > Warship) about Michael J Bird's scripts for Warship

 

Leander-class frigates
1967 ships
Gulf War ships of the United Kingdom
Maritime incidents in 1984